Bu Zhi Chun (pronounced ) is a Wuyi oolong with a light taste.

References
 Babelcarp on Bu Zhi Chun

Wuyi tea
Oolong tea
Chinese teas
Chinese tea grown in Fujian